The Coast Guard of the Border Service of the FSB, previously known as the Maritime Units of the KGB Border Troops, is the coast guard of Russia. 

The purpose of the formation of the Coast Guard of the FSB of Russia is to create a modern comprehensive and multifunctional system for protecting the national interests of Russia in the border area on the border area (sea coast, inland sea waters and the territorial sea), in the exclusive economic zone and on the continental shelf of Russia, taking into account the ongoing changes in political, economic, social life in the country and providing favorable conditions for the implementation of legal economic, fishing and other activities in the maritime border area of Russia.

Currently, the Coast Guard is part of the Border Guard Service of Russia under the Federal Security Service of Russia (Береговая охрана Пограничной службы ФСБ России).

History

Marine Units of the Border Troops of the USSR 

After the end of the Great Patriotic War in 1945, the Marine Units of the Border Troops (MCHPV) carried out the protection of the Soviet Union's maritime borders until its collapse. In different periods of 1945-1957 's border troops, along with their member MCHPV, included in the structure of the various law enforcement agencies of the Soviet Union: the NKVD, MGB, MVD USSR. In 1957, the Marine units of the border troops, along with the rest of the border units , became part of the State Security Committee under the Council of Ministers of the USSR, which in 1978 was transformed into an independent state committee - USSR State Security Committee (KGB of the USSR).

On October 22, 1991, the KGB of the USSR was abolished, on the basis of its former structures, 3 separate departments were created: the Inter-Republican Security Service , the Central Intelligence Service and the Committee for the Protection of the State Border of the USSR. The latter is responsible for the transfer of powers for the protection of the state border, in connection with which the Border Troops (and, accordingly, the Marine units that are part of them) are transferred to his subordination.

On October 28, 1992, by Decree of the President of the Russian Federation No. 1309 Committee for the Protection of the State Border of the USSR was abolished, in accordance with which the Border Troops, together with their Naval Units, were transferred to the subordination of the Ministry of Security of the Russian Federation (MBRF) formed on January 24, 1992.

On June 12, 1992, the Border Troops of the Russian Federation formed as part of the MBRF on the basis of the former Committee for the Protection of the State Border and the troops subordinate to it , while the Maritime Units of the Border Troops of the Russian Federation (MCHPV of Russia) are one of their components.

On December 21, 1993, the MBRF was abolished, on its basis the Federal Counterintelligence Service of the Russian Federation was created , while on December 30, 1993, on the basis of the Border Troops and their control bodies, an independent federal executive body was created: the Federal Border Service - Main Command of the Border Troops of the Russian Federation (FPS - Glavkomat).

Maritime Border Forces 

In 1994, as part of the FPS - High Command, the MCHPV of Russia was reorganized into the Naval Forces of the Border Troops of the Russian Federation . The command of the naval forces of the Border Troops of the Russian Federation was created - instead of the post of the Deputy Commander of the Border Troops of the Russian Federation for the naval unit, the post of Commander of the naval forces of the Border Troops of the Russian Federation was approved.

December 30, 1994 FPS - Glavkomat changes its name and is transformed into the Federal Border Service of the Russian Federation (FPS of Russia)

Marine Guard 
August 29, 1997, in accordance with the Decree of the President of the Russian Federation No. 950 "On measures to ensure the protection of marine biological resources and state control in this area", on the basis of the Maritime Forces of the Border Troops, as well as the staff and material and technical means of the central office and regional fisheries protection bodies of the Ministry of Agriculture and Food of the Russian Federation ( Ministry of Agriculture and Food of Russia), the Marine Guard of the Federal Border Service of the Russian Federation (MOHR FPS of Russia) is formed as part of the FPS of Russia.

Since this period, the MOHR FPS of Russia, in addition to the defense of the water boundaries of the State Border of the Russian Federation, has been assigned the task of protecting aquatic biological resources in internal sea waters, as well as in the Caspian and Azov Seas. As part of the Federal Border Guard Service of Russia, a management body of the Maritime Guard is formed - the Department of Maritime Guard Admiral I. I. Naletov is appointed Deputy Director - Head of the Department of Maritime Security of the Federal Border Guard Service of Russia, since 1999 - Vice Admiral V. K. Logvinenko.

On July 1, 2003, the Federal Border Service of the Russian Federation is abolished, and its functions are transferred to the jurisdiction of the Border Service created by the same Decree as part of the Federal Security Service of the Russian Federation (FSB of Russia). To organize the activities of the newly created structure, the Organizational Department of the Border Service of the FSB of Russia is formed, within which, on the basis of the former Maritime Department, the Maritime Directorate of the FSB of Russia is organized - the control body of the Maritime Guard of the Border Service of the FSB of Russia (MOHR of the FSB of Russia).

Coast Guard 
On July 20, 2004, on the basis of the Maritime Guard of the FSB of Russia, the Coast Guard of the Border Guard Service of the FSB of Russia (BOKHR of the FSB of Russia) was formed. In the Organizational Department of the FSB of Russia, the former Maritime Administration is reorganized into the Coast Guard Administration of the Border Guard Service of the FSB of Russia.

In 2005, the Russian Federation abolished such a type of power structures as border troops - since that time, all military formations, government agencies, inspection bodies and their management bodies of the Border Service of the FSB of Russia (including the Coast Guard) are called border agencies.

At the same time, in 2005, the Border Service of the FSB of Russia begins to transfer the system of manning the personnel of military units (ships) of the border agencies completely to a contract basis, with a gradual reduction in the number of servicemen doing military service by conscription. The process of transition to a contractual basis, which equally affected the bodies of the security guard of the FSB of Russia, was completed by the beginning of 2009.

On August 20, 2007, the Coast Guard Directorate was reorganized into the Coast Guard Department of the Border Guard Service of the FSB of Russia. At present, the main personnel of the Coast Guard, as well as all border agencies of the FSB of Russia, are military personnel doing military service under contract, with the exception of the OMBIR bodies, staffed by federal government officials and civilian personnel.

Training and study
The FSB Coast Guard Institute (Институт береговой охраны ФСБ России), located in Anapa, was established in 2007. Cadets study for 4 years.

Ranks

Missions
The Russian Coast Guard has various missions, such as the protection of Russia's maritime borders, ensuring safe navigation in territorial waters, assisting vessels and aircraft, weather reconnaissance, fisheries protection, and fighting against smuggling and piracy. To perform these missions the Russian Coast Guard uses a variety of vessels and aircraft.

Equipment
The Russian Coast Guard is equipped with a variety of vessels, aircraft, and small arms/mounted weapons.

Vessels
Vessels of the Russian Coast Guard are:
Frigates (FFG): 2 - Nerey class/Krivak III class (both Pacific -  and Orel)
Corvettes: 1 - Pauk-class corvettes (Pacific - Sokol)
Offshore patrol vessels: up to 25 - various types: 14 - Rubin class patrol boat (7 Black Sea; 3 Pacific; 2 Northern; 1 in Baltic and 1 in  Caspian as of 2022), 2 - Okean class patrol vessels (1 Northern, 1 Pacific); 4 - Project 850285 (all Pacific)
Patrol Icebreakers: 4 - Ivan Susanin-class patrol ship (1 Northern, 3 Pacific as of 2020), 8 - Purga class icebreaker (6 Pacific; 1 Northern; 1 - unknown); Future: Project 23550 patrol ship - planned for service entry with the Russian Navy and Coast Guard toward the mid-2020s
Patrol boats (PCF): Around 130+ patrol boats, 21 - Sobol class patrol boat, 30 - Svetlyak-class patrol boat, 56 - Mangust class patrol boat, 5 - Lamantin class patrol boat, 4 - Rondo class patrol boat, 3 - Mirage class patrol vessel, 1 - Zhuk-class patrol boat, 2 - Sokzhoy class patrol boat, 3 - Mustang 2-class patrol boat, 14 - Project 1496M patrol vessels (6 Pacific, 4 Black Sea, 2 Caspian, 1 Northern, 1 Baltic)
River craft: 18 - Vosh class river patrol craft, 8 - Piyavka class river patrol craft, 4 - Ogonek class river patrol craft, 1 - Yaz-class river patrol craft
Coastal logistics ships: 7 - Neon Antonov class coastal logistics ship
Armed seagoing tug: c. 14 - Sorum class seagoing tug (c. 4 Northern, 6 Pacific, 2 Black Sea, 1 Caspian, 1 Baltic)

The number of vessels listed above are based on a list of currently active Russian Coast Guard vessels.

Aircraft
 Antonov An-26
 Ilyushin Il-76
 Mil Mi-8
 Kamov Ka-27
 Ka-226T
 Schiebel Camcopter S-100

Weapons
The Russian Coast Guard uses a variety of weapons, this includes but is not limited to the AK series of rifles, pistols, grenade based weapons such as the DP-64 hand anti-diver grenade launcher and the 30 mm AGS-17 automatic grenade launcher, and a variety of machine guns from 7.62 mm machine guns to 14.5 mm machine guns. Large weapons aboard vessels can be anything from naval guns, torpedoes, and missiles.

Commanders 

 Admiral Innokentiy Nalyotov (1996-1999)
Vice-Admiral Valery Logvinenko (1999-2004)
 Vice-Admiral Vyacheslav Serzhanin (2004–2006)
 Colonel-General Viktor Trufanov (2006-2011)
 Vice-Amiral Yuri Alexeyev (2011-2017)
Admiral Gennady Medvedev (2017-present)

Gallery

See also
National Guard Naval Service Corps, the naval service, water police and coast guard branch of the National Guard Forces Command, National Guard of Russia.
Greenpeace Arctic Sunrise ship case

References

External link

Federal Security Service
Border guards
Military of Russia
Borders of Russia
Russia